Bramalea—Gore—Malton (formerly known as Brampton—Malton and Bramalea—Gore—Malton—Springdale) was a federal electoral district in Ontario, Canada, that was represented in the House of Commons of Canada. In 2015, it was dissolved into the ridings of Brampton East, Mississauga—Malton, Brampton Centre and Brampton North.

The district was created as "Brampton—Malton" in 1987 from Brampton—Georgetown and Mississauga North. The name was changed to "Bramalea—Gore—Malton" in 1990, and to "Bramalea—Gore—Malton—Springdale" in 1998

In 2003, Bramalea—Gore—Malton—Springdale was abolished when it was redistributed between a new "Bramalea—Gore—Malton", Brampton—Springdale and Mississauga—Brampton South ridings.

In 2001, it had a population of 119,886 and an area of 151 km2.

It includes the neighbourhoods of Colerane, Ebenezer, Woodhill, Bramalea and Gorewood Acres in the City of Brampton and the neighbourhoods of Malton, Marvin Heights and Ridgewood in the City of Mississauga.

41.9% of people in Bramalea—Gore—Malton are of East Indian ethnic origin, the highest such percentage in Canada. Slightly more than a quarter of the population (25.1%) are immigrants from Southern Asia, which is also the highest such figure for any riding.

Member of Parliament
This riding has elected the following Member of Parliament:

Federal election results 

 		

Note: Conservative vote is compared to the total of the Canadian Alliance vote and Progressive Conservative vote in 2000 election.

Bramalea—Gore—Malton—Springdale 

Note: Canadian Alliance vote is compared to the Reform vote in 1997 election.

Brampton—Malton

See also 
 List of Canadian federal electoral districts
 Past Canadian electoral districts

References

Federal riding history:
Brampton-Malton
 Bramalea—Gore—Malton, 1990 - 1998
Bramalea—Gore—Malton—Springdale
Bramalea—Gore—Malton, 2004 - 2008
Bramalea—Gore—Malton, 2011
 Campaign expense data from Elections Canada

Notes

Former federal electoral districts of Ontario
Politics of Brampton
Politics of Mississauga